All for Old Ireland is an American silent film produced by Sid Films and distributed by Lubin Manufacturing Company. It was directed by Sidney Olcott and played by Valentine Grant, Laurene Santley and PH O'Malley in the leading roles.

Cast
 Valentine Grant as Nora Doyle
 Sidney Olcott as Con Daly
 Laurene Santley as Mrs Doyle
 PH O'Malley as Myles Murphy
 Arthur G. Lee as Colonel Reid
 Robert Rivers as Feely, the Informer
 Charles McConnell as Father O'Flynn
 Jack Melville as Robert Emmett

Production notes
The film was shot in Beaufort, co Kerry, in Ireland during summer 1914.

References
 Michel Derrien, Aux origines du cinéma irlandais: Sidney Olcott, le premier oeil, TIR 2013.

External links
 
 All For Old Ireland at Irish Film & TV Research Online
  All For Old Ireland website dedicated to Sidney Olcott

1915 films
Silent American drama films
American silent short films
American black-and-white films
Films set in Ireland
Films shot in Ireland
Films directed by Sidney Olcott
1915 short films
1915 drama films
1910s American films